Selections from the Paramount Picture "Just for You" is a Decca Records studio album by Bing Crosby, Jane Wyman and The Andrews Sisters of songs featured in the film Just for You released in 1952. All of the songs were written by Harry Warren (music) and Leo Robin (lyrics).

Reception
Billboard reviewed the album saying, inter alia: “With the title flicker still to open and run what promises to be a long course, this album of ditties featured in the film figures to do right well over the counter. Crosby and Miss Wyman, of course, star in the pic. While the Andrews Sisters do not appear in the movie, their efforts on this disk add plus values… Liner carries a synopsis of the film and fairly detailed biographies of the artists featured on the disk.” 

The Crosby and Jane Wyman duet “Zing a Little Zong” reached the No. 18 spot in the Best-sellers list and remained in the charts for six weeks. Leo Robin wrote an opening verse which was not used in the film or the commercial recording but it does help to set the scene and explain the use of the last letter of the alphabet.

"Let’s imagine we’re in Holland and we’re underneath the moon,

Let’s walk a little, talk a little, kiss a little,

Cling a little, sigh a little, sing a little tune…

Zing a Little Zong"

The Billboard review of "Zing" was enthusiastic. "Bing Crosby and Jane Wyman team up for a sock waxing of this cute novelty ditty from their flick “Just for You”. Bing sounds more relaxed than he has in a long time and the thrush carries her part in fine fashion. The Jud Conlon Rhythmaires help out spiritedly. Side should get a lot of plays and spins due to impact of movie."

“Zing a Little Zong” was nominated for the Academy Award for Best Original Song of 1952 but lost out to "High Noon".

LP releases
The songs were featured on a 10” vinyl LP numbered DL 5417 and in a 4-disc 45rpm box set numbered 9-350.

LP track listing
Side 1

Side 2

The songs featuring Crosby were subsequently included in a 12” Decca LP numbered DL4263 issued in 1962 and subtitled “Zing a Little Zong” as part of the Bing's Hollywood series.

References

Bing Crosby albums
1952 albums
Decca Records albums